Ballad of the Little Soldier is a 1984 documentary film directed by Werner Herzog and Denis Reichle about children soldiers in Nicaragua. The film focuses on a group of Miskito Indians who used children soldiers in their resistance against the Sandinistas.

Herzog made and co-directed the film at the request of his friend Denis Reichle, a French-German journalist who himself served as a child-soldier in the Volkssturm at age fourteen in the final days of World War II. Reichle had attempted to make his own film about child soldiers but that project had stalled and he approached Herzog for help. The film is often cited as Herzog's most explicitly political, though Herzog denies that he had any specific statement on the politics of the Sandinistas. Herzog has said that the film is about child soldiers, and could have been made in any of several countries where child soldiers exist.

References about the little soldiers

Further reading

External links
 

1984 films
1984 documentary films
West German films
German documentary films
Documentary films about child soldiers
1980s English-language films
1980s German films